Burma competed as Myanmar at the 1996 Summer Olympics in Atlanta, United States.

Athletics

Men
Track & road events

Women
Track & road events

Shooting

Men

References
Official Olympic Reports

Nations at the 1996 Summer Olympics
1996
Oly